Luis Ramón Barceló Amado (born 10 November 1953) is a Chilean lawyer who was elected as a member of the Chilean Constitutional Convention. Similarly, he was the provincial governor of the Bío-Bío Region from 2014 to 2018.

In his youth, he was member of the Revolutionary Left Movement («Movimiento de Izquierda Revolucionaria»; MIR).

References

External links
 

Living people
1954 births
21st-century Chilean politicians
University of Chile alumni
Revolutionary Left Movement (Chile) politicians
Socialist Party of Chile politicians
Party for Democracy (Chile) politicians
Members of the Chilean Constitutional Convention
People from Santiago